Stochastic Resonance: From Suprathreshold Stochastic Resonance to Stochastic Signal Quantization, is a science text, with a foreword by Sergey M. Bezrukov and Bart Kosko, which notably explores the relationships between stochastic resonance, suprathreshold stochastic resonance, stochastic quantization, and computational neuroscience. The book critically evaluates the field of stochastic resonance, considers various constraints and trade-offs in the performance of stochastic quantizers,  culminating in a chapter on the application of suprathreshold stochastic resonance to the design of cochlear implants. The book also discusses, in detail, the relationship between dithering and stochastic resonance.

Reception
The book has received a favorable book review in the journal Contemporary Physics in 2009.

See also
 Stochastic resonance
 Suprathreshold stochastic resonance

References

External links
 Book's homepage at Cambridge University Press (CUP)
  Google book entry
 Citations on Google Scholar

Physics textbooks
Engineering textbooks
2008 non-fiction books